E numbers ("E" stands for "Europe") are codes for substances used as food additives, including those found naturally in many foods such as vitamin C, for use within the European Union (EU) and European Free Trade Association (EFTA). Commonly found on food labels, their safety assessment and approval are the responsibility of the European Food Safety Authority (EFSA). The fact that an additive has an E number implies that its use was at one time permitted in products for sale in the European Single Market; some of these additives are no longer allowed today.

Having a single unified list for food additives was first agreed upon in 1962 with food colouring. In 1964, the directives for preservatives were added, in 1970 antioxidants were added, in 1974 emulsifiers, stabilisers, thickeners and gelling agents were added as well.

Numbering schemes
The numbering scheme follows that of the International Numbering System (INS) as determined by the Codex Alimentarius committee, though only a subset of the INS additives are approved for use in the European Union as food additives. Outside the European continent plus Russia, E numbers are also encountered on food labelling in other jurisdictions, including the Cooperation Council for the Arab States of the Gulf, South Africa, Australia, New Zealand, Malaysia, Hong Kong, and India.

Colloquial use
In some European countries, the "E number" is used informally as a derogatory term for artificial food additives. For example, in the UK, food companies are required to include the ‘E Number(s)’ in the ingredients that are added as part of the manufacturing process. Many components of naturally occurring healthy foods and vitamins have assigned E numbers (and the number is a synonym for the chemical component), e.g. vitamin C (E300) and lycopene (E160d), found in carrots. At the same time, "E number" is sometimes misunderstood to imply approval for safe consumption. This is not necessarily the case, e.g. Avoparcin (E715) is an antibiotic once used in animal feed, but is no longer permitted in the EU, and has never been permitted for human consumption.

Classification by numeric range

NB: Not all examples of a class fall into the given numeric range. Moreover, many chemicals, particularly in the E400–499 range, have a variety of purposes.

Full list
The list shows all components that have an E-number assigned, even those no longer allowed in the EU.

E100–E199 (colours)

E200–E299 (preservatives)

E300–E399 (antioxidants, acidity regulators)

E400–E499 (thickeners, stabilisers, emulsifiers)

E500–E599 (acidity regulators, anti-caking agents)

E600–E699 (flavour enhancer)

E700–E799 (antibiotics)

E900–E999 (glazing agents, gases and sweeteners)

E1000–E1599 (additional additives)

See also 
 Food Chemicals Codex
 List of food additives
 International Numbering System for Food Additives
 Clean label

References

External links
CODEXALIMENTARIUS FAO-WHO, the international foods standards, established by the Food and Agriculture Organization (FAO) and the World Health Organization (WHO) in 1963
See also their document "Class Names and the International Numbering System for Food Additives" (Ref: CAC/GL #36 publ. in 1989, Revised in 2008, Amended in 2018, 2019, 2021)
Joint FAO/WHO Expert Committee on Food Additives (JECFA) publications at the World Health Organization (WHO)
Food Additive Index, JECFA, Food and Agriculture Organization (FAO)
E-codes and ingredients search engine with details/suggestions for Muslims 
Databases of EU-approved food additives and flavoring substances
Food Additives in the European Union
The Food Additives and Ingredients Association, FAIA website, UK.

Chemical numbering schemes
Chemistry-related lists
Food additives
European Union food law
1962 introductions
Number-related lists